Jacques Palminger (born Heinrich Ebber in 1964 in Borken, North Rhine-Westphalia) is a German actor, musician, and member of the comedy ensemble Studio Braun.

Discography

Albums 
 2007: Rasta Dub ’76 — Les Tools D’Amour (Nobistor)
 2008: Mondo Cherry (mit The Kings Of Dub Rock) (PIAS Germany)
 2009: Songs For Joy (mit Erobique) (Staatsakt)

Singles and EPs 
 1999: Sabàta (Gagarin Records)
 1999: Universal Gonzáles (DJ Melanie)
 2003: Deutsche Frau (Gagarin Records)
 2007: Die "Henry" Maske (Nobistor)
 2008: Polizeihubschrauber (mit The Kings Of Dub Rock) (Vulcano)
 2009: Pudel Produkte 9 (Nobistor)

References

External links
 

1964 births
Living people
People from Borken, North Rhine-Westphalia
German male film actors
German male musicians
German male television actors